Airgas, an Air Liquide company, is an American supplier of industrial, medical and specialty gases (delivered in packaged or cylinder form), as well as hardgoods and related products; one of the largest U.S. suppliers of safety products; and a leading U.S. supplier of ammonia products and process chemicals. The company is headquartered in Radnor Township, Pennsylvania.

Business Activities

Airgas, an Air Liquide company, is a supplier of gases, welding equipment and supplies, and safety products.

With more than one million customers, Airgas sells the following:
 Industrial, medical and specialty gases
 Welding equipment and supplies
 Safety products
 Atmospheric gases
 Carbon Dioxide
 Dry Ice
 Nitrous Oxide
 Ammonia
 Process Chemicals

The company has 18,000 employees in the following industries:
 Manufacturing and metal fabrication
 Non-residential construction (energy and infrastructure)
 Energy and chemicals (upstream, midstream and downstream)
 Life sciences and healthcare
 Food, beverage and retail services
 Materials and power
 Government, defense and aerospace

Its integrated network of about 1,400 locations includes branches, cylinder fill plants, production facilities, specialty gas laboratories, and regional distribution centers. Airgas markets through multiple channels, including its own branches and outside sales force, a Strategic Accounts Team focused on large customers, distributors and resellers, telesales, catalog and e-Business channels.

History
Airgas was founded by Chairman and Chief Executive Officer Peter McCausland in 1982, and became a publicly traded company in 1986. Through more than 500 acquisitions and internal growth, Airgas built the largest national distribution network in the packaged gas industry. One of these acquisitions is Red-D-Arc Welderentals which was acquired in 1995 for an undisclosed fee.

On September 8, 2009, Airgas replaced Cooper Industries in the S&P500 index. In October 2009, John McGlade, the President and Chief Executive Officer of Air Products, a competing concern, privately asked McCausland whether he'd be interested in merging the two companies. McCausland rejected the idea. In February 2010, Air Products initiated a public tender offer for Airgas. The offer was extended, and the price increased, throughout the subsequent year. Air Products abandoned the effort on February 15, 2011, after a decision by the Delaware Chancery Court that upheld Airgas's extensive use of a "poison pill" defense.

In November 2015, Airgas agreed to be acquired by France’s Air Liquide for a total of $13.4 billion. This deal was approved by the Airgas Board of Directors and shareholders. Airgas had previously avoided a $5.9 billion hostile takeover by Air Products and Chemicals. The acquisition was finalized and announced on May 23, 2016 and Airgas is now a wholly owned subsidiary of Air Liquide.

In 2019, Airgas signed a definitive agreement to acquire TA Corporate Holdings, Inc. (“Tech Air”), a large independent distributor of industrial gases and welding supplies serving various geographies in the United States.

References

Air Liquide
Industrial gases
American companies established in 1982
Chemical companies established in 1982
2015 mergers and acquisitions
Companies based in Delaware County, Pennsylvania
Companies formerly listed on the New York Stock Exchange
Transportation companies of the United States
Chemical companies of the United States
1982 establishments in Pennsylvania
American subsidiaries of foreign companies
Radnor Township, Delaware County, Pennsylvania
Transportation companies based in Pennsylvania